Onion Lake 119-1 is an Indian reserve of the Onion Lake Cree Nation in Saskatchewan. In the 2016 Canadian Census, it recorded a population of 0 living in 0 of its 0 total private dwellings.

References

Indian reserves in Saskatchewan